The 1925–26 Swiss National Ice Hockey Championship was the 16th edition of the national ice hockey championship in Switzerland. HC Davos won the championship by defeating HC Rosey Gstaad in the final.

First round

Eastern Series 
 HC Davos - Akademischer EHC Zürich 7:0

HC Davos qualified for the final.

Western Series 
 HC Rosey Gstaad - HC Château-d’Œx 6:1

HC Rosey Gstaad qualified for the final.

Final 
 HC Davos - HC Rosey Gstaad 4:2

External links 
Swiss Ice Hockey Federation – All-time results

National
Swiss National Ice Hockey Championship seasons